Infanta, officially the Municipality of Infanta, is a 3rd class municipality in the province of Pangasinan, Philippines. According to the 2020 census, it has a population of 26,242 people.

Geography

Barangays
Infanta is politically subdivided into 13 barangays. These barangays are headed by elected officials: Barangay Captain, Barangay Council, whose members are called Barangay Councilors. All are elected every three years.

 Bamban
 Batang
 Bayambang
 Cato
 Doliman
 Patima
 Maya
 Nangalisan
 Nayom
 Pita
 Poblacion
 Potol
 Babuyan

Climate

Demographics

Economy

Government
Infanta, belonging to the first congressional district of the province of Pangasinan, is governed by a mayor designated as its local chief executive and by a municipal council as its legislative body in accordance with the Local Government Code. The mayor, vice mayor, and the councilors are elected directly by the people through an election which is being held every three years.

Elected officials

References

External links

 Infanta Profile at PhilAtlas.com
  Municipal Profile at the National Competitiveness Council of the Philippines
 Infanta at the Pangasinan Government Website 
 Local Governance Performance Management System
 [ Philippine Standard Geographic Code]
 Philippine Census Information

Municipalities of Pangasinan